Erich Kellerhals (8 November 1939 – 25 December 2017) was a German billionaire, co-founder of Media-Saturn-Holding GmbH, owner of Media Markt. In March 2017, his net worth was estimated at US$1.8 billion.

Career
Erich and Helga Kellerhals, together with Walter Gunz and Leopold Stiefel, co-founded Media-Saturn-Holding GmbH, owner of Media Markt.

Personal life
He was married with one child, and lived in Ingolstadt, Germany.

References

1939 births
2017 deaths
German billionaires
German businesspeople in retailing
20th-century German businesspeople
21st-century German businesspeople
People from Ingolstadt